The Antioch Bridge (officially the Senator John A. Nejedly Bridge) is an automobile, bicycle, and pedestrian bridge in the western United States. Located in northern California, it crosses the San Joaquin River-Stockton Deepwater Shipping Channel, linking Antioch in Contra Costa County with Sherman Island in southern Sacramento County, near Rio Vista.

Named after state senator John Nejedly, the bridge is signed as part of State Route 160. Unlike other toll bridges in California, it has only a single lane of traffic for each direction. It is one of several bridges in the Bay area that are traversable by pedestrians and bicyclists in addition to automobiles.

History

1926 toll bridge
The original structure was completed in 1926 by the American Toll Bridge Company (Aven Hanford and Oscar Klatt), who went on to build the original span of the Carquinez Bridge. The bridge was opened on 1 January 1926 as a connecting link on the coast-to-coast Victory Highway.

The Delta Bridge corporation had formed in December 1922, but did not complete a bridge at Antioch. Delta Bridge had received a franchise to build in June 1923.

The original lift span bridge was plagued with problems throughout its lifetime.

State purchase
In 1937, Assemblyman Earl D. Desmond urged the California Toll Bridge Authority to acquire the Antioch Bridge. Desmond believed that by purchasing the bridge, tolls could be eliminated, which would spur economic growth. Tolls were reduced immediately and further reduced in 1942.

Marine traffic collisions
The narrow ship channel afforded by the raised span led to marine traffic colliding with the bridge in 1958 (rammed by Kaimana), 1963 (rammed by Pasadena) and 1970 (rammed by Washington Bear).

The 1970 collision spurred efforts to build a replacement bridge. In that incident, the lift span was stuck in the raised position. The bridge tender could not leave the bridge and remained in the control house for 20 hours. Local firemen eventually made their way to him and brought him out.  The bridge was closed for repairs for 5 months.

1978 replacement bridge
Sen. Nejedly authored Senate Bill 25, which later became Chapter 765 of the California Statutes of 1972, authorizing the issuance of revenue bonds to fund the construction of a replacement to the existing bridge. The bill cited the recent extended disruptions in bridge service from marine traffic damage as well as flooding of the approaches.

The high-level bridge opened in December 1978. Shortly before completion, the replacement bridge was named to honor Sen. Nejedly.

Tolls
Tolls are only collected from northbound traffic at the toll plaza on the south end (Antioch) of the bridge. All-electronic tolling has been in effect since 2020, and drivers may either pay using the FasTrak electronic toll collection device, using the license plate tolling program, or via a one time payment online. Effective , the toll rate for passenger cars is $7. During peak traffic hours, carpool vehicles carrying three or more people, clean air vehicles, or motorcycles may pay a discounted toll of $3.50 if they have FasTrak and use the designated carpool lane. Drivers must pay within 48 hours after crossing the bridge or they will be sent a toll violation invoice. No additional fees will be added to the toll violation if it is paid within 21 days.

Historical toll rates
Crossing the original 1926 bridge required a toll, but tolls were removed in 1945 after the state bought the bridge in 1940. Under the ownership of the American Toll Bridge company, in 1940, tolls were 45cents per car (equivalent to $ in ) plus fivecents (equivalent to $ in ) per passenger. After the state took ownership, tolls were immediately reduced to thirty cents per car (equivalent to $ in ) for up to four passengers. In 1942, tolls were further reduced to 25cents per car (equivalent to $ in ). then removed three years later. Tolls were reinstated in 1978 with the completion of the new span at fifty cents per car (equivalent to $ in ), collected northbound only.

The basic toll (for automobiles) on the seven state-owned bridges, including the Antioch Bridge, was raised to $1 by Regional Measure 1, approved by Bay Area voters in 1988. A $1 seismic retrofit surcharge was added in 1998 by the state legislature, originally for eight years, but since then extended to December 2037 (AB1171, October 2001). On March 2, 2004, voters approved Regional Measure 2, raising the toll by another dollar to three dollars (equivalent to $ in ). An additional dollar was added to the toll starting January 1, 2007, to cover cost overruns concerning the replacement of the eastern span.

The Metropolitan Transportation Commission, a regional transportation agency, in its capacity as the Bay Area Toll Authority, administers RM1 and RM2 funds, a significant portion of which are allocated to public transit capital improvements and operating subsidies in the transportation corridors served by the bridges. Caltrans administers the "second dollar" seismic surcharge, and receives some of the MTC-administered funds to perform other maintenance work on the bridges. The Bay Area Toll Authority is made up of appointed officials put in place by various city and county governments, and is not subject to direct voter oversight.

Due to further funding shortages for seismic retrofit projects, the Bay Area Toll Authority again raised tolls on all seven of the state-owned bridges in July 2010. The toll rate for autos on the Antioch Bridge was thus increased to five dollars (equivalent to $ in ).

In June 2018, Bay Area voters approved Regional Measure 3 to further raise the tolls on all seven of the state-owned bridges to fund $4.5 billion worth of transportation improvements in the area. Under the passed measure, the toll rate for autos on the Antioch Bridge was increased to six dollars on January 1, 2019, and will rise to $7 in 2022 and $8 in 2025.

In September 2019, the MTC approved a $4 million plan to eliminate toll takers and convert all seven of the state-owned bridges to all-electronic tolling, citing that 80 percent of drivers are now using Fastrak and the change would improve traffic flow. On March 20, 2020, accelerated by the COVID-19 pandemic, all-electronic tolling was placed in effect for all seven state-owned toll bridges. The MTC then installed new systems at all seven bridges to make them permanently cashless by the start of 2021. In April 2022, the Bay Area Toll Authority announced plans to remove all remaining unused toll booths and create an open-road tolling system which functions at highway speeds.

Animal incidents
In 1965, three circus lions escaped from a truck passing over the Antioch Bridge. Two were quickly recaptured, but one drowned after falling into the river.

Humphrey the Whale was stranded near the Antioch Bridge in 1985.

References

Sources

Caltrans Facts - Bay Area

External links

 Bay Area FasTrak – includes toll information on this and the other Bay Area toll facilities
 
 

Bridges in the San Francisco Bay Area
Road bridges in California
Plate girder bridges
Toll bridges in California
Bridges completed in 1930
Bridges completed in 1978
Bridges in Contra Costa County, California
Bridges in Sacramento County, California
Antioch, California
San Francisco Bay
Steel bridges in the United States
Plate girder bridges in the United States